Alewife may refer to:

 Alewife (fish), a North American herring
 Alewife (trade), a female brewer
 Alewife station, in Cambridge, Massachusetts
 "Alewife", a song from the Clairo album Immunity
 Alewife Brook Reservation, a state park in Massachusetts 
 Alewife Brook Parkway, in Massachusetts 
 Alewife Linear Park, in Massachusetts  
 Alewife (multiprocessor), a computer system

See also
Dead Alewives, an improvisational comedy troupe